McGregor Mountain is an  elevation massif located in the Stehekin Valley of the North Cascades, in Chelan County of Washington state. McGregor Mountain is situated northwest of Lake Chelan in the northern Methow Mountains, on the shared border of North Cascades National Park and Lake Chelan National Recreation Area. The closest community is Stehekin, and the nearest higher neighbor is Goode Mountain,  to the northwest. Precipitation runoff from the mountain drains into tributaries of the Stehekin River. Topographic relief is significant since the southern aspect of the mountain rises 6,600 feet above this river in approximately two miles. The famous Pacific Crest Trail traverses the western base of this mountain, and the strenuous 7.7-mile (12.4 km) McGregor Mountain Trail gains 6,400 feet (1,920 m) of elevation to take hikers within a half-mile of the summit. Reaching the summit requires exposed scrambling the final 1,100 feet (330 m), and an ice axe is needed if the trail remains covered by snowpack. The summit was the site of an old fire lookout cabin from 1923 until 1955, but now has a radio repeater for the National Park Service. The views from the top include Glacier Peak, Black Peak, Corteo Peak, Frisco Mountain, Tupshin Peak, Dome Peak, Glory Mountain, and many others. This mountain was named for Billy McGregor, a Stehekin Valley resident who had a cabin and homestead at the base of this mountain during the 1890s. In May 1901, Billy disappeared overnight from a boat docked in Lake Chelan, and was never seen or heard from again.

Climate
McGregor Mountain has an alpine climate which supports the Sandalee Glacier on its northern slopes. Most weather fronts originate in the Pacific Ocean, and travel northeast toward the Cascade Mountains. As fronts approach the North Cascades, they are forced upward by the peaks of the Cascade Range, causing them to drop their moisture in the form of rain or snowfall onto the Cascades (Orographic lift). As a result, the North Cascades experiences high precipitation, especially during the winter months in the form of snowfall. During winter months, weather is usually cloudy, but, due to high pressure systems over the Pacific Ocean that intensify during summer months, there is often little or no cloud cover during the summer.

Geology

The North Cascades features some of the most rugged topography in the Cascade Range with craggy peaks and ridges, deep glacial valleys, and granite spires. Geological events occurring many years ago created the diverse topography and drastic elevation changes over the Cascade Range leading to the various climate differences. These climate differences lead to vegetation variety defining the ecoregions in this area.

The history of the formation of the Cascade Mountains dates back millions of years ago to the late Eocene Epoch. With the North American Plate overriding the Pacific Plate, episodes of volcanic igneous activity persisted. In addition, small fragments of the oceanic and continental lithosphere called terranes created the North Cascades about 50 million years ago.

During the Pleistocene period dating back over two million years ago, glaciation advancing and retreating repeatedly scoured the landscape leaving deposits of rock debris. The U-shaped cross section of the river valleys are a result of recent glaciation. Uplift and faulting in combination with glaciation have been the dominant processes which have created the tall peaks and deep valleys of the North Cascades area.

See also

 Geology of the Pacific Northwest
 Geography of the North Cascades

Gallery

References

External links
 McGregor Mountain: Mountain Forecast
 McGregor Mountain weather forecast
 McGregor Mountain Trail National Park Service
 Aerial photo: PBase

North Cascades
Mountains of Washington (state)
Mountains of Chelan County, Washington
Cascade Range
North Cascades National Park
North American 2000 m summits